Kercheche or  is a town in Diguna Fango woreda, Wolayita Zone of Southern Nations, Nationalities, and Peoples' Region. The coordinate point of Kercheche lies between 6°57'21"N 37°59'29"E. The amenities in the town are 24 hours electric light, pure water service, kindergarten, primary school, high school, all time market, health stations and others.

References

Wolayita
Populated places in the Southern Nations, Nationalities, and Peoples' Region
Cities and towns in Wolayita Zone